Fred Rouhling (born 24 January 1970) is a French rock climber and boulderer, noted for creating and repeating some of the earliest grade  sport climbing routes in the world, including Hugh in 1993, the first-ever French  sport route.

Early life
Rouhling grew up in the small French farming town of Le Panissaud. His neighboring village of Vilhonneur has a limestone quarry (which supplied materials for the Statue of Liberty). Twenty minutes away is the larger town of Angoulême, where limestone crags overhang many of the roads, with the best-known being Les Eaux Claires ("The Clear Waters"), with 15 to 20-metre overhanging extreme routes that require strong fingers to manage the small pockets used to ascend them; and contains nationally-regarded extreme routes such as La Crépinette (1983), France's first .

Climbing career

Hugh, first 9a in France
In the early 1990s, Rouhling had moved to the south of France for college where he also had access to the leading sport climbing venues of France.  Rouhling made the first ascent of UFO, the first  in the Calanaques, and then completed Les Spécialistes Direct at the Verdon Gorge. Les Spécialistes Direct was a variation on Jean-Baptiste Tribout's famous 1987 route, Les Spécialistes, which was bolted earlier by Alain Robert; with the downgrade of Les Spécialistes to 8b+, Rouhling's ascent remains the first 8c route in the gorge.

Returning home in 1993, Rouhling wanted to create different routes from the long steep stamina crimpy routes of the Calanques and Verdon. At his local crag of Eaux-Clairs, he freed a line he called Hugh with a double-overhanging bulge that required little footwork. At the time, there were only three known 9a routes in the world. Hugh was repeated in 2001, and by Dai Koyamada (2002), and Sébastien Bouin (2020), confirming the grade of 9a, the first 9a in France.

The use of chipping to create new extreme routes was not uncommon then in France, and included examples such as 's famous Buoux route, La Rose et la Vampire .  Some major North American routes also relied on chipped holds for their development, with examples such as The Phoenix  in Yosemite , and Just do It  at Smith Rocks. In a 2021 documentary, Rouhling said that finding natural new hard routes is difficult (particularly of the overhanging roof style that he was attracted to) and that the chipping of new "hardest" routes was far more widespread than was understood; Rouhling also noted that other leading French climbers had manufactured such routes in their own local quarries for their development and training.

Akira controversy
Home again in 1995 as his wife was recovering from back surgery, Rouhling began work on a new route he called  in the Vilhonneur quarry. Akira was a 65-foot long low horizontal roof (only circa 12 feet off the ground), that he estimated had an  bouldering problem, with a final 20-foot  vertical section beyond the lip (the only part for which he used a rope); such a route was unprecedented as a sport climb at the time. At the time, nobody had climbed 9a+ (Chris Sharma would climb the wold's first consensus 9a+ in 2001, and the first consensus 9b in 2008).

Rouhling faced an unprecedented level of personalized attack for Akira.  Leading climbers publicly challenged his integrity, and various unsubstantiated theories were promoted about Rouhling and his routes. Those that tried Akira, failed to climb it.  In 2004, Climbing sent Pete Ward (a future American Alpine Club Board member), to interview Rouhling over several days, and see him on his routes.  Ward could not opine on the grade but verified that Rouhling was able to climb his routes as they were. Ward also believed that Rouhling should have classed Akira as a boulder problem rather than as a sport route. Ward was able to debunk several of the criticisms about Rouhling and Akira, and expressed a positive view of Rouhling from the interview process.

Bouin said: "Anyway this route is hard", "and quite unbelievable for the 90's". Rouhling was disappointed at the downgrade and felt that the requirement to hang from a pinch hold in the roof at the first crux, while familiar in contemporary extreme routes, was novel in 1995, and was why no climber of his generation could send the route. In 2021, the climbing database 8a.nu agreed that changes in equipment and techniques for roof climbing could explain much of the downgrade. In 2022, climbing author Sam Anderson attributed some of the vilification of Rouhling to the fact that at the time, he was not considered "the world's best climber", and thus would not be accepted as the person who climbed "the world's hardest route".

Return to climbing
After Akira, Rouhling's wife Celine needed brain surgery for a life-threatening illness, and Rouhling largely abandoned extreme climbing for a number of years to focus on his family and young children. In 2001, on his wife's recovery, Rouhling repeated Fred Nicole's , that – after Fred's brother François – was the second-ever repeat of a 9a-graded route in history.

Rouhling did not use any chipping to create these new routes, they were natural. In 2007 Rouhling went on bouldering trips with French climber Romain Desgranges to Rocklands, South Africa and to Joshua Tree, California. In 2010, the pair went on a bouldering trip to New Zealand where Rouhling repeated Chris Sharma's 2005 problem, Archilles last stand , which was Rouhling's 100th boulder ascent above .

In 2009, one of the main online databases for extreme rock climbers, 8a.nu, asked the question "Is Fred Rouhling the best ever FA [first ascent] climber in the world?", noting that Rouhling's combination of first ascents for the hardest sport climbs and hard bouldering routes ranked him #3 in their All-Time High Combined rankings.

In a 2021 interview, Rouhling said that he then only climbed a few times a year and that while as a climber, he was very disappointed with the reception to his 9a routes, as an artist (he sculpts in his spare time), he was very proud of his creations, and the emotions and engagement that they still aroused in the climbing community.

Personal life
Rouhling is married to Céline with whom they have two children, Hugo and Chloe. 

Rouhling sculpts in his spare time.

Notable ascents

Redpointed routes 

:

 Salamandre – Double Cache crag, Saint-Pierre-en-Faucigny (FRA) – 2007. First ascent (natural route, no chipping).  First repeat by Baptiste Dherbilly in 2017.

:

 Mandallaz Drive – Allonzier-la-Caille, (FRA) – 2004. First ascent (natural route, no chipping). First repeat by Baptiste Dherbilly in 2021.

 – Saint Loup, (CHF) – 2001. Third ascent of Fred Nicole's 1993 route; at the time of Rouhling's ascent, there were only four known 9a routes in the world.

 L'autre côté du Ciel – Les Eaux-Claires (Charente), (FRA) – 1997. First ascent. Rouhling almost entirely manufactured the route by chipping out the holds (a practice at the time but since shunned).

  – Vilhonneur (Charente), (FRA) – 1995. First ascent. Rouhling used some chipping and hold filling to create the route. He estimated it at 9b, the world's first-ever 9b (and even 9a+) at the time, and created one of the most famous grading disputes in sport climbing history.

Hugh – Les Eaux-Claires (Charente), (FRA) – 1993. First ascent. First-ever French 9a-graded sport route and fourth 9a in the world. Rouhling chipped out some new holds and filled in others to create the route.

:

 Empreinte – Double Cache crag, Saint-Pierre-en-Faucigny (FRA) – 2008. First ascent (natural route, no chipping). Rouhling proposed 9a+; first repeat by Baptiste Dherbilly in 2021 said 8c+.
Non à la Bombe  – Saint Loup, (CHF) – 2001. Repeat of Fred Nicole's 1995 route. 
Archipel – Les Eaux-Claires (Charente), (FRA) – 1997. First ascent. First repeat by Dai Koyamada and Yuji Hirayama in 2000 (and first repeat of any Rouhling route above 8c+) who confirmed grade.
Kami – Les Eaux-Claires (Charente), (FRA) – 1994. First ascent. First repeat by Pierre Bollinger in 2001.

:

 La voie du Charpentier – Allonzier-la-Caille (FRA) – 2005. First ascent.
 Les Spécialistes Direct – Verdon Gorge (FRA) – 1994. First ascent, and first 8c in the Verdun Gorge. Variation of Jean-Baptiste Tribout's famous 1987 8b+ route, bolted by Alain Robert.
 UFO – Massif des Calanques (FRA) – 1993. First ascent.

Boulder problems 

:

E la nave va (Traverse) – Lindental, (SUI) – 2003. First repeat of Fred Nicole's 1994 boulder traverse problem.

:

Soumission – Le Bourrinoire, Haute-Savoie, (FRA) – 2006. First ascent. Route was subsequently destroyed, along with Romain Desgranges's classic, Kaiser Sauzé 8C+.
Eau Profonde – Kesslerloch, Schaffhausen, (SUI) – 2003(e). First repeat of Fred Nicole's 1997 boulder problem.
Broadsword (Traverse) – Lindental, (SUI) – 2003. Repeat of Fred Nicole's 1995 boulder traverse problem.
Va piu via (Traverse) – Lindental, (SUI) – 2003. Repeat.
Joyeux Leon (Traverse) – La Balmaz, (SUI) – 2003. Repeat of Fred Nicole's 1992 boulder traverse problem.
Le voyage du Crabe (Traverse) – Saint-George, (SUI) – 2003. Repeat.
Prophécie – Saint-George, (SUI) – 2003. Repeat.

See also
 Romain Desgranges, climbing partner of Rouhling
 Jumbo Love, would become the first climb in the world with a consensus grade of

Notes

References

External links
VIDEO: Fred Rouhling interview post-Akira 2020 repeat with Relis Vertical, Gripped (September 2021)
VIDEO: Fred Rouhling on Mandallaz Drive 9a, Grimper (2021)
VIDEO: Fred Rouhling on Salamandre 9a+, PlanetMountain (2011)
List of Fred Rouhling First Ascents (archived from the Fred Rouhling website) 
French climbing database: Fred Rouhling, list of historic routes, and videos of Rouhling on his main routes
Climbing-org database: Fred Rouhling, list of historic routes, and videos of Rouhling on his main routes
VIDEO: Seb Bouin on Rouhling's Unrepeated 9s trilogy, UKClimbing (2021)

Rouhling, Fred
Rouhling, Fred
Rouhling, Fred
Sportspeople from Charente